Kliment Boyadzhiev (15 April 1861 – 15 July 1933) was a Bulgarian general during the Balkan Wars and World War I.

Biography
Born in Ohrid, he studied in an elementary school there. After the liberation of Bulgaria in 1878, he emigrated to Sofia. In 1883, he graduated from the Military School in Sofia and in 1895 graduated from the Military Academy in Torino, Italy with excellent marks.

During the successful Serbo-Bulgarian War in 1885, he was an aide-de-camp in the Western Corps quarters. He distinguished himself in the Battle of Lule Burgas during the First Balkan War as a commander of the Fourth Preslav Infantry Division. Between 22 August 1913 and 1 September 1913, Kliment Boyadzhiev was the Minister of War.

During World War I, he commanded the 1st Army which achieved major successes against the Royal Serbian Army in the offiensives of Morava and Kosovo. Boyadzhiev remained in that position until 25 September 1916, when he was replaced by Dimitar Geshov and went to the reserve. The general was awarded four Bulgarian medals for courage and bravery, as well as one Russian. After the war, between 1918 and 1923 he emigrated to Germany.

He was also an author of a relief map of Bulgaria in 1902.

Boyadzhiev died in Sofia in 1933.

Honours
Order of Bravery
Order of St Alexander
Order of Military Merit
Order of Stara Planina, 1st grade with swords - awarded posthumously on 20 December 2012
Ottoman Liakat Medal
Boyadzhiev Point in Antarctica is named after Kliment Boyadzhiev.

References 

Ташев, Ташо (1999). "Министрите на България 1879-1999". София: АИ „Проф. Марин Дринов" / Изд. на МО.

1861 births
1933 deaths
People from Ohrid
Bulgarian generals
People of the Serbo-Bulgarian War
Bulgarian military personnel of World War I
Bulgarian military personnel of the Balkan Wars
Recipients of the Order of Bravery
Recipients of the Order of Military Merit (Bulgaria)
Recipients of the Liakat Medal
Macedonian Bulgarians
Bulgarian emigrants to Germany
Defence ministers of Bulgaria
Chiefs of staff